World Capital Tower is an skyscraper at Mega Kuningan, South Jakarta, Indonesia. The skyscraper is expected to be completed by second quarter of 2017. The skyscraper has total floor area of 70,000 sq.meters with retail & entertainment space. The tower, which is 270 meter-tall, has 54 floors. It is one of the tallest office buildings in Jakarta.

The WCT is equipped with bomb and metal detection equipment, including 10 meters of glass applications and 19 mm thick bomb blast glass proof material in the main lobby. To reduce noise from outside and to reject the heat of the sun, the tower is equipped with infrared rays, and building facades coated low-e-double glass. WCT will also be equipped with a garden area of 3,000 square meters and a special building (annex) three floors covering an area of 2.700 square meters for retail and lifestyle, especially food & beverage.

See also
List of tallest buildings in Indonesia
List of tallest buildings in Jakarta

References

Towers in Indonesia
Buildings and structures in Jakarta
Skyscrapers in Indonesia
Post-independence architecture of Indonesia
Skyscraper office buildings in Indonesia